The Madagascar sparrowhawk (Accipiter madagascariensis) is a species of bird of prey in the family Accipitridae.

It is endemic to Madagascar. Its natural habitats are subtropical or tropical dry forest, subtropical or tropical moist lowland forest, subtropical or tropical moist montane forest, dry savanna, and subtropical or tropical dry shrubland.

It is threatened by habitat loss.

It may form a superspecies with Eurasian sparrowhawk (A. nisus) and rufous-chested sparrowhawk (A. rufiventris) (Ferguson-Lees and Christie 2001).

References

 Ferguson-Lees, James and David A. Christie (2001) Raptors of the World. Christopher Helm, London. pp. 578–581. 

Madagascar sparrowhawk
Endemic birds of Madagascar
Birds of prey of Madagascar
Madagascar sparrowhawk
Taxonomy articles created by Polbot